Dean Notting (born 14 January 1966) is a former Australian rules footballer who played with Richmond in the Victorian Football League (VFL).

Career
Notting, a recruit from Lake Boga, first broke into the Richmond team late in the 1985 VFL season, to make two league appearances. In his first game of the 1986 season, Richmond's round four win over North Melbourne, Notting received a Brownlow Medal vote, then had his best performance a week later with five goals against St Kilda at the MCG. He finished the season with 13 appearances, a tally he matched in 1987, his final season. His 28 career games is a record for a player wearing number 58.

References

External links

1966 births
Australian rules footballers from Victoria (Australia)
Richmond Football Club players
Living people